Chahar Taq (also Romanized as Chahār Ţāq and Chahārţāq) is a village in Jereh Rural District, Jereh and Baladeh District, Kazerun County, Fars Province, Iran. At the 2006 census, its population was 94, in 16 families.

References 

Populated places in Kazerun County